Nadja is a 1994 American horror film written and directed by Michael Almereyda, and starring Elina Löwensohn in the title role and Peter Fonda as Abraham Van Helsing. Nadja is a vampire film that treats genre elements in an understated arthouse style. It received mixed reviews from critics.

Plot

Count Voivoide Arminius Chousescu Dracula dies with a stake in his heart, and his daughter Nadja (Elina Löwensohn) shows up to claim the body, hoping that his death will free her from the life her father has forced on her. She has the body cremated and prepares to take the ashes to Brooklyn and pay a visit to her twin brother Edgar whom she hasn't seen for a long time. Before she leaves, however, she stops for a drink and meets Lucy. Lucy is also feeling a sense of emptiness, so she takes Nadja home. They appear to cheer each other up, and they wind up having sex together.

Van Helsing (Peter Fonda) killed Dracula and his nephew Jim, who also happens to be Lucy's husband, has to bail him out of jail. Helsing knows that, if Dracula's body is not destroyed properly, he'll be back. When Helsing learns that Dracula's body has been removed from the morgue, he enlists Jim's help.

Meanwhile, Nadja goes to visit Edgar, who is sick, and meets his nurse and live-in lover Cassandra. Nadja persuades Cassandra to move Edgar to her apartment where she can help him by transfusing him with plasma from the blood of shark embryos, which is what Nadja uses to stay healthy. Edgar revives enough to drink some of Nadja's blood. However, Lucy has fallen under Nadja's mesmerism. She leads both Jim and Van Helsing to Edgar's house where Nadja is staying with Renfield. Edgar awakens long enough to warn Cassandra to leave the house, as she is in danger. Cassandra, who just happens to be Van Helsing's daughter, attempts to escape with Nadja pursuing her, Lucy pursuing Nadja, and Jim pursuing Lucy. Cassandra runs into a gas station where it looks like two burly mechanics are going to protect her, but Nadja mesmerizes them and kills one of them. A policeman enters the gas station and shoots Nadja in the abdomen.

Edgar, who is improving, unites with the Helsings to stop Nadja. He receives a "psychic fax" from Nadja, telling him that she is injured and must return to Transylvania. She also mentions that she's taking Cassandra with her, so Edgar and the Helsings high-tail it to Transylvania, too. As they approach the castle, Nadja begins a transfusion of Cassandra's blood while Cassandra sleeps. While Jim fights with Renfield, Edgar and Helsing drive a stake through Nadja's heart. Lucy is released, Nadja is destroyed, and Cassandra wakes up. However, not all is as it seems. Nadja narrates the epilogue: "They cut off my head...burned my body...no one knew...no one suspected that I was now alive in Cassandra's body. Edgar and I were married at City Hall...there *is* a better way to live."

Style

The deadpan acting, episodic nature of the plot, and the presence of Martin Donovan and Löwensohn are suggestive of a Hal Hartley film, though he was not involved in the production. The Chicago Review called it "Hal Hartley meets David Lynch".  Lynch himself has a cameo and executive produces.

The film is shot in black and white by Jim Denault mostly at night in Manhattan and Brooklyn using a PXL-2000, and is underscored by a dreamlike score/soundscape by Simon Fisher Turner, as well as the songs "Soon" and "Lose My Breath" by My Bloody Valentine, and "Strangers" and "Roads" by Portishead.

Cast
 Elina Löwensohn as Nadja
 Peter Fonda as Van Helsing
 Suzy Amis as Cassandra
 Galaxy Craze as Lucy
 Martin Donovan as Jim
 Karl Geary as Renfield
 Jared Harris as Edgar
 David Lynch (also Executive producer) as morgue attendant (cameo)
 Nic Ratner  as Bar Victim
 Jack Lotz  as Boxing Coach
 Isabel Gillies  as Waitress
 Jose Zuniga  as Bartender
 Bernadette Jurkowski  as Dracula's Bride
 Jeff Winner  as Young Dracula
 Sean  as Bela
 Bob Gosse as Garage Mechanics
 Rome Neal as Garage Mechanics
 Giancarlo Roma  as Romanian Kid
 Anna Roma  as Romanian Mother
 Thomas Roma as Romanian Policemen
 Aleksandar Rasic as Romanian Policemen
 Miranda Russell  as Lucy's Baby

Reception 
On the review aggregator website Rotten Tomatoes, Nadja holds an approval rating of 64% based on 25 reviews, with an average rating of 5.8/10. The website's critics' consensus reads: "Nadja approaches the Dracula legend from an idiosyncratic angle - and with just enough visual style to overcome uneven storytelling."

Roger Ebert, writing for the Chicago Sun-Times, gave the film a rating of two-and-a-half out of four stars, characterizing it as "an example of a genre we can call Deadpan Noir. It's the kind of movie that deals with unspeakable subjects while keeping a certain ironic distance, and using dialogue that seems funny, although the characters never seem in on the joke."

References

External links
 
 
 

1994 films
Camcorder films
American vampire films
Fictional vampires
1994 horror films
Films set in New York City
American supernatural horror films
1990s English-language films
1990s American films